Two ships of the Royal Navy have been named HMS Louis, after Rear-Admiral Sir Thomas Louis:

  was a  destroyer, built as HMS Talisman, but renamed before being launched in 1913. She was wrecked in 1915.
  was a  launched in 1943 and transferred to the Royal Navy under lend-lease. She was returned to the US Navy in 1946.

See also
 Louis (disambiguation)
 
 
 

Royal Navy ship names